The Westlander is an Australian passenger train operated by Queensland Rail on the Main and Western lines between Brisbane and the outback town of Charleville.

Background
In the 1888 timetable the train from Brisbane to Roma was officially called the Western Mail, with some runs extended through to Morven. With the opening of the line from Morven to Charleville on 1 March 1888 the train was again extended.

Victorian Railways introduced air-conditioned trains in 1935, and Queensland Rail decided to follow suit in the late 1940s. Steel carriages were designed to travel to all parts of the system, meaning a maximum axle load of 9 tons, which was a challenge for the dining cars. New features included showers in the sleeping cars, roomettes in first class and head end power cars, especially necessary where trains may be delayed by floods or other events, as was often the case.

History
The Westlander was introduced in August 1954, replacing the Western Mail and its wooden carriages with the present Commonwealth Engineering, Rocklea steel air-conditioned carriages. Initially the Quilpie connecting train was not air-conditioned, so in 1967 a generator was fitted to an insulated van to provide power for an air-conditioned sitting car and mechanical refrigeration for the van to provide this comfort on the Quilpie service.

Later the Westlander was divided at Charleville, the service to Quilpie (3Q02) being nicknamed the Flying Flea and consisted of two passenger carriages, a guards van and power van. The remainder of the train (3V02) headed to Cunnamulla via Westgate and Wyandra. In 1970 the Flea had the honour of being the fastest train in Queensland, with an average speed of 

In August 1994 the service was cut back to Charleville.

The return service (3907) departed Cunnamulla at 09:00 arriving in Brisbane at lunchtime the next day. Even with the line speed from Cunnamulla being , the train was still preferred by many due to the lack of quality roads at the time. By 1957 freight wagons were also attached to the train, including louvred steel QRX and QLX-T wagons, and MPR refrigerated wagons. Up to 16 vehicles could make up the train. Passenger services beyond Charleville to Cunnamulla (3V02) and Quilpie (3Q22) were withdrawn in 1994.

Today
As at October 2020, the train runs twice weekly to Charleville with a journey time of 17 hours. Connecting coach services operate to Cunnamulla and Quilpie.

The westbound service (3S86) departs from Platform 10 at Roma Street Railway Station on Tuesdays and Thursdays at 7:15pm and arrives at Charleville Railway Station at 11:45am on Wednesdays and Fridays.

The eastbound service (3987) departs from Charleville Railway Station at 6:15pm on Wednesdays and Fridays and arrives at Platform 10 at Roma Street Railway Station at 11:25am on Thursdays and Saturdays.

Crews for the Westlander are based at Toowoomba, Chinchilla and Roma. 

The train currently consists of: 

 3 L series cars (1 LSCL Lounge/Staff Car, 1 LAL Sitting Car and 1 LBL Sitting Car) 
 a QPB Power-Baggage Car

the QPB Power-Baggage Car was only enabled to run on this service because of the tunnel clearance-enabling works which were undertaken by Queensland Rail in early 2020.

The dining and sleeping (M series) cars were withdrawn from 1 January 2015, with catering now provided by at seat snack packs delivered at mealtimes.

On the 16 June 2021, a $1M Business case was announced by the Queensland State Government to investigate replacement of The Westlander, Spirit of the Outback and Inlander Services.

Subsidy levels

In 2016, the service was estimated to have carried 3,677 people in the previous financial year, with the effective subsidy paid by the Queensland State Government for each passenger amounting to an estimated $4,007 (total subsidy $14.7m)

In 2021, the service carried 2,999 people in previous financial year, with the effective subsidy paid by the Queensland Government for each passenger at $4,928.90.

References

Named passenger trains of Queensland
Night trains of Australia
Railway services introduced in 1954
1954 establishments in Australia